Vuylsteke is a surname. Notable people with the surname include:

Julius Vuylsteke (1836–1903), Belgian politician and writer
Richard Vuylsteke, American diplomat